Monterey station was a train station in Monterey, California located close to Fisherman's Wharf. Originally served by the Monterey & Salinas Valley Railroad, the line was purchased by Southern Pacific on September 29, 1879. Southern Pacific constructed a new station building in 1921. Train service ended with the cancellation of the Del Monte after April 30, 1971, when Amtrak took over passenger rail services in the United States.

The depot was converted to retail space, and is occupied by a brewpub .

Restoration of service along the Monterey Branch Line was studied in the 1984-89 Caltrans passenger rail development plan. Later suggestions call for establishment of light rail service along the Monterey Branch Line, but the Monterey stop is planned to be located at the Custom House Plaza.

References

Railway stations closed in 1971
Railway stations in Monterey County, California
Former Southern Pacific Railroad stations in California
Buildings and structures in Monterey, California
Repurposed railway stations in the United States